The 2017 European Amateur Team Championship took place 11–15 July at Diamond Country Club, in Atzenbrugg, Austria. It was the 34th men's golf European Amateur Team Championship.

Venue 
The hosting Diamond Championship Course at Diamond Country Club, surrounding a centrally located 10-hectare artificial lake, located in Atzenbrugg in the district of Tulln in the Austrian state of Lower Austria, 35 kilometres west of the city center of capital Vienna, was designed by Jeremy Pern and opened in 2002. It had previously been home for several Austrian Open tournaments on the European Tour.

The championship course was set up with par 72 over 7,457 yards.

Format 
Each team consisted of six players, playing two rounds of an opening stroke-play qualifying competition over two days, counting the five best scores each day for each team.

The eight best teams formed flight A, in knock-out match-play over the next three days. The teams were seeded based on their positions after the stroke play. The first placed team was drawn to play the quarter final against the eight placed team, the second against the seventh, the third against the sixth and the fourth against the fifth. Teams were allowed to use six players during the team matches, selecting four of them in the two morning foursome games and five players in to the afternoon single games. Teams knocked out after the quarter finals played one foursome game and four single games in each of their remaining matches. Games all square at the 18th hole were declared halved, if the team match was already decided.

The eight teams placed 9–16 in the qualification stroke-play formed flight B, to play similar knock-out play, with one foursome game and four single games in each match, to decide their final positions.

Teams 
16 nation teams contested the event.  Iceland, Wales and the Czech Republic qualified  after finishing first, second and third at the 2016 Division 2. Each team consisted of six players.

Players in the leading teams

Other participating teams

Winners 
Leader of the opening 36-hole competition was team England, with an 8-under-par score of 712, seven strokes ahead of team Norway. Team Sweden, on third place, was another stroke behind.

There was no official award for the lowest individual score, but individual leader was Kristoffer Reitan, Norway, with a 5-under-par score of 139, two strokes ahead of six players tied on second place.

Team Spain won the gold medal, earning their fourth title, beating team England in the final 4–3.

Italy earned the bronze on third place, after beating Sweden 4–3 in the bronze match.

Belgium, Switzerland and Wales placed 14th, 15th and 16th and was moved to Division 2 for 2018.

Results 
Qualification round

Team standings

Individual leaders

Note: There was no official award for the lowest individual score.

Flight A

Bracket

Final games

Flight B

Bracket

Final standings

Sources:

See also 
 Eisenhower Trophy – biennial world amateur team golf championship for men organized by the International Golf Federation.
 European Ladies' Team Championship – European amateur team golf championship for women organised by the European Golf Association.

References

External links 
European Golf Association: Full results

European Amateur Team Championship
Golf tournaments in Austria
European Amateur Team Championship
European Amateur Team Championship
European Amateur Team Championship